Muhammad Salman Mohsin Gillani (born 4 July 1977) is a Pakistani politician who had been a member of the National Assembly of Pakistan from 2008 to 2013.

Early life
He was born on 4 July 1977.

Political career
He was elected to the National Assembly of Pakistan from Constituency NA-165 (Pakpattan-II) as a candidate of Pakistan Muslim League (N) (PML-N) in 2008 Pakistani general election. He received 67,400 votes and defeated Mian Ahmad Raza Khan Maneka, a candidate of Pakistan Muslim League (Q) (PML-Q).

References

Living people
1977 births
Pakistani MNAs 2008–2013